Elly Hakami (born August 25, 1969) is a former professional tennis player from the U.S. She played from the mid-1980s until 1997. Hakami is from Tiburon, California. She was ranked world No. 32 in 1988.

After beating Hakami in 1987, Martina Navratilova said of Hakami: "She's a very good player. She seems to be very bright and she's a lot better all-court player than I thought she would be. I thought she served well and she comes out tough."

Family
Hakami is married to Polo Cowan, a tennis pro at the Tiburon Peninsula Club. They have two children, Sonya and Polo, and live in Tiburon, California.

References

American female tennis players
Tennis people from California
Living people
1969 births
People from Tiburon, California
Grand Slam (tennis) champions in girls' singles
US Open (tennis) junior champions
21st-century American women